This is a list of National Basketball Association players whose last names begin with I or J. 

The list also includes players from the American National Basketball League (NBL), the Basketball Association of America (BAA), and the original American Basketball Association (ABA). All of these leagues contributed to the formation of the present-day NBA.

Individuals who played in the NBL prior to its 1949 merger with the BAA are listed in italics, as they are not traditionally listed in the NBA's official player registers.

I

Marc Iavaroni
Serge Ibaka
Andre Iguodala
Žydrūnas Ilgauskas
Mile Ilić
Ersan İlyasova
Darrall Imhoff
Tom Ingelsby
Joe Ingles
Damien Inglis
Andre Ingram
Brandon Ingram
McCoy Ingram
Ervin Inniger
Byron Irvin
George Irvine
Kyrie Irving
Jonathan Isaac
John Isaacs
Dan Issel
Mike Iuzzolino
Allen Iverson
Willie Iverson
Jaden Ivey
Royal Ivey
Elvin Ivory
Wes Iwundu

J

Warren Jabali
George Jablonski
Jarrett Jack
Aaron Jackson
Al Jackson
Bobby Jackson
Cedric Jackson
Darnell Jackson
Demetrius Jackson
Frank Jackson
Greg Jackson
Isaiah Jackson
Jaren Jackson
Jaren Jackson Jr.
Jermaine Jackson
Jim Jackson
Josh Jackson
Justin Jackson
Lucious Jackson
Luke Jackson
Marc Jackson
Mark Jackson
Mervin Jackson
Michael Jackson
Mike Jackson
Myron Jackson
Phil Jackson
Pierre Jackson
Quenton Jackson
Ralph Jackson
Randell Jackson
Reggie Jackson
Stan Jackson
Stanley Jackson
Stephen Jackson
Tony Jackson (b. 1942)
Tony Jackson (b. 1958)
Tracy Jackson
Wardell Jackson
Fred Jacobs
Casey Jacobsen
Sam Jacobson
Stub Jacobson
Lou Jagnow
Dave Jamerson
Aaron James
Bernard James
Billy James
Damion James
Gene James
Henry James
Jerome James
Justin James
LeBron James
Mike James (b. 1975)
Mike James (b. 1990)
Tim James
Antawn Jamison
Harold Jamison
John Janisch
Howie Janotta
Marko Jarić
Tony Jaros
DeJon Jarreau
Jim Jarvis
Šarūnas Jasikevičius
Nathan Jawai
Buddy Jeannette
Abdul Jeelani
Chris Jefferies
Othyus Jeffers
Al Jefferson
Amile Jefferson
Cory Jefferson
Dontell Jefferson
Richard Jefferson
DaQuan Jeffries
Jared Jeffries
Charles Jenkins
Horace Jenkins
John Jenkins
Brandon Jennings
Jack Jennings
Keith Jennings
Chris Jent
Les Jepsen
Jonas Jerebko
Ty Jerome
Grant Jerrett
Bill Jesko
Eugene Jeter
Hal Jeter
Charlie Joachim
Isaiah Joe
Britton Johnsen
Al Johnson
Alexander Johnson
Alize Johnson
Amir Johnson
Andy Johnson
Anthony Johnson
Armon Johnson
Arnie Johnson
Avery Johnson
B. J. Johnson
Boag Johnson
Bob Johnson
Brice Johnson
Buck Johnson
Cameron Johnson
Carldell Johnson
Charles Johnson
Chris Johnson (b. 1985)
Chris Johnson (b. 1990)
Clay Johnson
Clemon Johnson
Dakari Johnson
Darryl Johnson
Dave Johnson (b. 1970)
David Johnson (b. 2001)
DeMarco Johnson
Dennis Johnson
DerMarr Johnson
Ed Johnson
Eddie Johnson (b. 1955)
Eddie Johnson (b. 1959)
Elmer Johnson
Eric Johnson
Ervin Johnson
Frank Johnson
George Johnson (b. 1947)
George Johnson (b. 1948)
George Johnson (b. 1956)
Gus Johnson
Harold Johnson
Ivan Johnson
JaJuan Johnson
Jalen Johnson
James Johnson
Joe Johnson
John Johnson
Kannard Johnson
Keldon Johnson
Ken Johnson (b. 1962)
Ken Johnson (b. 1978)
Keon Johnson
Kevin Johnson
Larry Johnson (b. 1954)
Larry Johnson (b. 1969)
Lee Johnson
Linton Johnson
Lynbert Johnson
Magic Johnson
Marques Johnson
Mickey Johnson
Morris Johnson
Neil Johnson
Nick Johnson
Ollie Johnson
Omari Johnson
Orlando Johnson
Reggie Johnson
Rich Johnson
Ron Johnson
Splinter Johnson
Stanley Johnson
Steffond Johnson
Steve Johnson
Stew Johnson
Trey Johnson
Tyler Johnson
Vinnie Johnson
Wesley Johnson
Darius Johnson-Odom
Nate Johnston
Neil Johnston
Jim Johnstone
Nikola Jokić
Howie Jolliff
Alvin Jones
Anthony Jones
Askia Jones
Bill Jones (b. 1914)
Bill Jones (b. 1966)
Bobby Jones (b. 1951)
Bobby Jones (b. 1984)
Caldwell Jones
Carlik Jones
Casey Jones
Charles Jones (b. 1957)
Charles Jones (b. 1962)
Charles Jones (b. 1975)
Collis Jones
Dahntay Jones
Damian Jones
Damon Jones
DeQuan Jones
Derrick Jones Jr.
Dominique Jones
Dontae' Jones
Dwayne Jones
Dwight Jones
Earl Jones
Eddie Jones
Edgar Jones
Fred Jones
Herbert Jones
Hutch Jones
Jake Jones
Jalen Jones
James Jones
Jemerrio Jones
Jimmy Jones
Johnny Jones
Jumaine Jones
K. C. Jones
Kai Jones
Kevin Jones
Larry Jones
Major Jones
Mark Jones (b. 1961)
Mark Jones (b. 1975)
Mason Jones
Nick Jones
Ozell Jones
Perry Jones
Popeye Jones
Rich Jones
Robin Jones
Sam Jones
Shelton Jones
Solomon Jones
Steve Jones
Terrence Jones
Tre Jones
Tyus Jones
Wah Wah Jones
Wali Jones
Wil Jones
Willie Jones
Adonis Jordan
Charles Jordan
DeAndre Jordan
Eddie Jordan
Jerome Jordan
Ken Jordan
Michael Jordan
Reggie Jordan
Thomas Jordan
Walter Jordan
Phil Jordon
Johnny Jorgensen
Noble Jorgensen
Roger Jorgensen
Cory Joseph
Garth Joseph
Kris Joseph
Yvon Joseph
Nikola Jović
Jimmy Joyce
Kevin Joyce
Butch Joyner
Jeff Judkins
Paul Juntunen
Johnny Juzang

References
  NBA & ABA Players with Last Names Starting with I and J @ basketball-reference.com
 NBL Players with Last Names Starting with I and J @ basketball-reference.com

I